Silvanus nitidulus is a species of silvanid flat bark beetle in the family Silvanidae. It is found in North America.

References

Further reading

 
 

Silvanidae
Articles created by Qbugbot
Beetles described in 1854